Harold Clark "Bottles" Chesswas (18 June 1901 – 24 October 1956) was an Australian rules footballer who played with Collingwood in the VFL.

Family
The son of George Forrester Chesswas (1858–1924), and Louisa Chesswas (1862–1903), née Freeman, Harold Clark Chesswas was born in Collingwood, Victoria, on 18 June 1901.

He married Letitia Mary Lingham (1902–1972) in 1932.

Football
Chesswas was a utility player, who played mainly on the wing.

Death
He died at Kew, Victoria, on 24 October 1956.

Notes

References
 Sharland, W.S., "Hayes, Cheswass, and Bryant are Renowned for their Play in League Games", The Sporting Globe, (Saturday, 30 August 1924), p.8.
 Football: Oakleigh Coach: H. Chesswas (Coll.) Appointed, The Argus, (Friday, 29 January 1932), p.10.

External links

 
 
 Harry Cheswass (sic) at The VFA Project.
 Harry Chesswas at Boyles Football Photos.
 

1901 births
1956 deaths
Australian rules footballers from Melbourne
Australian Rules footballers: place kick exponents
Collingwood Football Club players
Collingwood Football Club Premiership players
Northcote Football Club players
Oakleigh Football Club players
Four-time VFL/AFL Premiership players
People from Collingwood, Victoria